Henry Monson may refer to:

 Sir Henry Monson, 3rd Baronet (1653–1718), English politician
 Henry Monson (gaoler) (1793–1866), New Zealand settler